Gates is an unincorporated rural hamlet in Custer County, Nebraska, United States. There is a large community center there, and a half-dozen homes, but no businesses or services.

History
Gates was named in honor of an early settler. A post office was established at Gates in 1884, and remained in operation until it was discontinued in 1989.

References

Populated places in Custer County, Nebraska
Unincorporated communities in Nebraska